Roderick Ernest Welsh (born c. 1912; date of death unknown) was an English footballer. His great-grandson, Matthew Dallman, also became a professional footballer.

Career
Welsh played for Dipton United, Annfield Plain and Durham City. He played one First Division game for Portsmouth on 6 May 1933. He joined Port Vale in May 1935. He made 20 Second Division and three FA Cup appearances in the 1935–36 relegation season, and broke an ankle at a 1–0 win over Southampton at The Dell on 31 March. He played 17 Third Division North games in the 1936–37 season and then played 27 league games in the 1937–38 season. He was given a free transfer away from The Old Recreation Ground in May 1938.

Career statistics
Source:

References

1910s births
Year of death missing
Footballers from Newcastle upon Tyne
English footballers
Association football fullbacks
Annfield Plain F.C. players
Durham City A.F.C. players
Portsmouth F.C. players
Port Vale F.C. players
English Football League players